The G Line, also known as the Gold Line during construction, is a Regional Transportation District (RTD) electric commuter rail line between Denver Union Station and Wheat Ridge, Colorado. Long scheduled to open in October 2016, the opening was delayed until mid-2019. The reason specified for the delay was timing issues experienced by the other commuter rail lines in the RTD system, which currently require a Federal Railroad Administration waiver to operate their grade crossings manually, and the wireless crossing system used by those lines.

History

The G Line uses the former Colorado and Southern Railway line which ran between Denver and Arvada until 1943.

The Gold Line is part of the RTD’s FasTracks expansion plan, and is operated by Denver Transit Partners as part of the Eagle P3 public–private partnership.  The line received a Record of Decision approval from the Federal Transit Administration in November 2009 allowing the line to be developed. Groundbreaking for the line  occurred on August 31, 2011, at a ceremony in Olde Town Arvada where US Transportation Secretary Ray LaHood announced the approval of a $1 billion grant to fund the project.

There are a total of eight stations: Union Station, 41st Avenue, Pecos, Federal, Sheridan, Olde Town, Arvada Ridge and Ward Road.

The project's nickname of the "Gold Line" refers to the June 1850 discovery of gold by Georgia prospector Lewis Ralston in Ralston Creek, which runs a few blocks from the Olde Town Station.

Delays

The G Line was originally scheduled to open in late 2016, but was delayed due to crossing gate issues with the RTD's A and B lines. The automated crossing gate system, unique to the RTD system, failed to receive federal and state approvals and relied on flaggers on a federal waiver for the first two lines. After RTD solved timing issues with the gates, subject to Federal Railroad Administration approval, the G Line opened without flaggers and quiet zones in place on April 26th, 2019. Testing began in January 2018 and the state's Public Utilities Commission approved the automated gates in March. Pending FRA approval of the crossing systems in December 2018, the agency claimed it could begin operations as late as Q1 2019. On April 1, 2019, RTD announced the opening of the G Line on April 26 following approval from respective organizations.

Route
The G Line's southern terminus is at Union Station in Denver. It runs on a railroad right-of-way north sharing track with the B Line until Pecos Junction station after which the two routes diverge. The G Line continues west to its terminus in Wheat Ridge.

Stations

References

RTD commuter rail
Transportation in Jefferson County, Colorado
25 kV AC railway electrification
Railway lines opened in 2019